Colleen Shannon (born April 14, 1978) is known as Playboy magazine's Playmate of the Month for January 2004 and the magazine's 50th anniversary Playmate.

Early life 
Shannon was born in Alaska and was raised in Pelican, Alaska. She attended high school in California.

Career 
Shannon was Playboy'''s 50th Anniversary Playmate in 2004. She also was featured in Playboy videos.

Shannon is a disc jockey and has performed with Snoop Dogg, Paul Oakenfold, and Funkmaster Flex. She has DJ'd at Harrah's Atlantic City, the Seminole Hard Rock Hotel and Casino Tampa, and LG Fashion Week. Shannon has also performed internationally in Lebanon, Abu Dhabi, Sweden, Mexico, South Africa and elsewhere.

She has appeared on How I Met Your Mother and in Miss Cast Away and the Island Girls. She has also been featured in OK!, Maxim, and Loaded''.

Legal issues 
Shannon was arrested in August 2012 for smuggling her Canadian boyfriend, Robert Skojo, into the United States. He was smuggled over the border at the St. Regis Mohawk Reservation in New York. Shannon and Skojo were arrested at Fort Covington, New York. She pleaded guilty in June 2013 of illegally "transporting an alien". In October 2013, she was sentenced to four months in United States Federal Prison and to pay a $5,000 fine.

Discography

References

External links 

 

Female models from Alaska
American film actresses
American television actresses
Women DJs
Living people
Models from Los Angeles
Musicians from Los Angeles
People from Los Angeles
People from Alaska
2000s Playboy Playmates
1978 births
Female models from California
21st-century American women musicians